The MEAC women's basketball tournament is the conference championship tournament in women's basketball for the Mid-Eastern Athletic Conference (MEAC). It is a single-elimination tournament involving all 13 league members, and seeding is based on regular-season records with head-to-head match-up as a tie-breaker.

The winner receives the conference's automatic bid to the NCAA Division I women's basketball tournament.

Results

List of championships by school

 Maryland Eastern Shore and North Carolina Central have not yet won a MEAC tournament.
 Winston-Salem State never won the tournament as a MEAC member.
 Schools highlighted in pink are former members of the MEAC

See also
MEAC men's basketball tournament

References